Cannington is a provincial electoral district for the Legislative Assembly of Saskatchewan, Canada. Located in the extreme southeast corner of the province, this constituency was redrawn to include the former district of Souris for the 18th Saskatchewan general election in 1975.

The original Cannington constituency, one of 25 created for the 1st Saskatchewan general election in 1905, was named after the Cannington Manor settlement located in the region.

Currently the safest seat for the Saskatchewan Party, it is arguably one of the most conservative ridings in the province – having never elected a member of the CCF or NDP.

The district has an economy based on grain and mixed farming. Oil production is scattered throughout the riding and oil service companies provide a great deal of off-farm employment. An integrated health facility in Wawota offers acute, long-term and palliative care.

The constituency's major communities include Carlyle, Oxbow, and Carnduff with populations of 2,129, 1,260 and 1,017 respectively. Smaller centres in the district include the towns of Redvers, Lampman, Stoughton, Wawota, Arcola and Alameda; and the villages of Manor, Gainsborough, Maryfield, Carievale and Kenosee Lake.

Members of the Legislative Assembly

Election results

|-

 
|NDP
|Todd Gervais
|align="right"|919
|align="right"|14.82
|align="right"|-1.77
 
|Prog. Conservative
|Chris Brown
|align="right"|457
|align="right"|7.37
|align="right"|-

|- bgcolor="white"
!align="left" colspan=3|Total
!align="right"|6,201
!align="right"|100.00
!align="right"|

|-

 
|NDP
|Henry Friesen
|align="right"|1,198
|align="right"|16.59
|align="right"|-4.9

|Liberal
|Karen Spelay
|align="right"|409
|align="right"|5.66
|align="right"|-1.89
|- bgcolor="white"
!align="left" colspan=3|Total
!align="right"|7,221
!align="right"|100.00
!align="right"|

|-

 
|NDP
|Henry Friesen
|align="right"|1,569
|align="right"|21.57
|align="right"|+6.99

|Liberal
|John Atwell
|align="right"|549
|align="right"|7.55
|align="right"|-2.99
|- bgcolor="white"
!align="left" colspan=3|Total
!align="right"|7,274
!align="right"|100.00
!align="right"|

|-

 
|NDP
|Glen Lawson
|align="right"|1,104
|align="right"|14.58
|align="right"|-9.40

|Liberal
|Joanne Johnston
|align="right"|798
|align="right"|10.54
|align="right"|-19.85
|- bgcolor="white"
!align="left" colspan=3|Total
!align="right"|7,573
!align="right"|100.00
!align="right"|

|-
 
| style="width: 130px"|Progressive Conservative
|Dan D'Autremont
|align="right"|3,542
|align="right"|45.63
|align="right"|+1.20

|Liberal
|Don Lees
|align="right"|2,359
|align="right"|30.39
|align="right"|+3.33
 
|NDP
|Gary Lake
|align="right"|1,861
|align="right"|23.98
|align="right"|-4.53
|- bgcolor="white"
!align="left" colspan=3|Total
!align="right"|7,762
!align="right"|100.00
!align="right"|

Souris-Cannington 

|-
 
| style="width: 130px"|Progressive Conservative
|Dan D'Autremont
|align="right"|2,980
|align="right"|44.43
|align="right"|-23.27
 
|NDP
|Ross Arthur
|align="right"|1,912
|align="right"|28.51
|align="right"|+6.21

|Liberal
|Don Lees
|align="right"|1,815
|align="right"|27.06
|align="right"|+17.06
|- bgcolor="white"
!align="left" colspan=3|Total
!align="right"|6,707
!align="right"|100.00
!align="right"|

|-
 
| style="width: 130px"|Progressive Conservative
|Eric Berntson
|align="right"|4,642
|align="right"|67.70
|align="right"|+11.25
 
|NDP
|Charlotte Rasmussen
|align="right"|1,529
|align="right"|22.30
|align="right"|-0.30

|Liberal
|William H. Ireland
|align="right"|686
|align="right"|10.00
|align="right"|+3.97
|- bgcolor="white"
!align="left" colspan=3|Total
!align="right"|6,857
!align="right"|100.00
!align="right"|

|-

| style="width: 130px"|Progressive Conservative
|Eric Berntson
|align="right"|4,093
|align="right"|56.45
|align="right"|+2.48
 
|NDP
|Dean Fraser
|align="right"|1,639
|align="right"|22.60
|align="right"|-6.54

|Liberal
|William J. Owens
|align="right"|437
|align="right"|6.03
|align="right"|-10.86
|- bgcolor="white"
!align="left" colspan=3|Total
!align="right"|7,251
!align="right"|100.00
!align="right"|

|-
 
| style="width: 130px"|Progressive Conservative
|Eric Berntson
|align="right"|3,739
|align="right"|53.97
|align="right"|+9.58
 
|NDP
|Dean Fraser
|align="right"|2,019
|align="right"|29.14
|align="right"|+8.00

|Liberal
|Gerard Belisle
|align="right"|1,170
|align="right"|16.89
|align="right"|-17.58
|- bgcolor="white"
!align="left" colspan=3|Total
!align="right"|6,928
!align="right"|100.00
!align="right"|

|-
 
| style="width: 130px"|Progressive Conservative
|Eric Berntson
|align="right"|3,212
|align="right"|44.39
|align="right"|–

|Liberal
|Thomas M. Weatherald
|align="right"|2,494
|align="right"|34.47
|align="right"|–
 
|NDP
|James T. Eaton
|align="right"|1,530
|align="right"|21.14
|align="right"|–
|- bgcolor="white"
!align="left" colspan=3|Total
!align="right"|7,236
!align="right"|100.00
!align="right"|

See also
Cannington (former electoral district)
Cannington Manor Provincial Historic Site

References

External links 
Website of the Legislative Assembly of Saskatchewan
Saskatchewan Archives Board – Saskatchewan Election Results By Electoral District

Saskatchewan provincial electoral districts